Euplocamus is a genus of moths in the family Tineidae. The genus was erected by Pierre André Latreille in 1809.

The genus includes:
 Euplocamus anthracinalis (Scopoli, 1763)
 Euplocamus cirriger Philippi, 1839 (taxon inquirendum)
 Euplocamus ophisa (Cramer, 1779)

Obsolete usage 
Euplocamus is also an old name for a genus of pheasants, subsequently subsumed first by Gennceus, and then by Lophura.

References

Euplocaminae